Bill Oates (October 15, 1939 – February 5, 2020) was an American basketball coach.  He coached college basketball for thirty years and amassed over 500 victories, most notably at NCAA Division I Saint Mary's and at the Master's College, and served as coach for Athletes in Action's basketball program.  He was the coach for the United States team in the 1978 FIBA World Championship in the Philippines.

Oates died on February 5, 2020, at age 80.

References

External links
 Saint Mary's record

1939 births
2020 deaths
American Christians
American men's basketball coaches
American men's basketball players
College men's basketball head coaches in the United States
Junior college men's basketball coaches in the United States
The Master's Mustangs men's basketball coaches
Menlo Oaks men's basketball coaches
Occidental Tigers men's basketball players
Saint Mary's Gaels men's basketball coaches
United States men's national basketball team coaches